Master general or Master-general can refer to:
 the Superior general of certain orders and congregations, such as 
the Canons Regular of the Order of the Holy Cross
the Dominicans (Master of the Order of Preachers)
the Order of the Blessed Virgin Mary of Mercy
the Order of Saint Lazarus
the Society of the Holy Cross
the Trinitarian Order
 certain secular titles and offices, such as Master-General of the Ordnance

Catholic ecclesiastical titles